Steve Holland (born April 29, 1968) is an American television producer and writer.

He has written and produced for a number of notable television series namely Kenan & Kel, Drake & Josh, Married to the Kellys, All That, Less than Perfect, Hype, Zoey 101, iCarly, The Big Bang Theory and most recently Rules of Engagement.

He is not to be confused with Savage Steve Holland, a television director and writer with a similar name, or Steve Holland, the writer who covers the White House and US politics for Reuters.

References

External links

Catergiores: 1968 Births

American television producers
American television writers
American male television writers
Living people
Place of birth missing (living people)
1968 births